John Surtees,  (11 February 1934 – 10 March 2017) was a British Grand Prix motorcycle road racer and Formula One driver. On his way to become a seven-time Grand Prix motorcycle World Champion, he won his first title in 1956, and followed with three consecutive doubles between 1958 and 1960, winning six World Championships in both the 500 and 350cc classes. Surtees then made the move to the pinnacle of Motorsport, the Formula 1 World Championship, and in 1964 made motor racing history by becoming the F1 World Champion. To this day Surtees remains the only person to have won World Championships on both two and four wheels. He founded the Surtees Racing Organisation team that competed as a constructor in Formula One, Formula 2 and Formula 5000 from 1970 to 1978. He was also the ambassador of the Racing Steps Foundation.

Motorcycle racing career
Surtees was the son of a south-London motorcycle dealer. His father Jack Surtees was an accomplished grasstrack competitor and in 1948 was the South Eastern Centre Sidecar Champion. He had his first professional outing, which they won, in the sidecar of his father's Vincent at the age of 14. However, when race officials discovered Surtees's age, they were disqualified. He entered his first race at 15 in a grasstrack competition. In 1950, at the age of 16, he went to work for the Vincent factory as an apprentice. He first gained prominence in 1951 when he gave Norton star Geoff Duke a strong challenge in an ACU race at the Thruxton Circuit.

In 1955, Norton race chief Joe Craig gave Surtees his first factory sponsored ride aboard the Nortons. He finished the year by beating reigning world champion Duke at Silverstone and then at Brands Hatch. However, with Norton in financial trouble and uncertain about their racing plans, Surtees accepted an offer to race for the MV Agusta factory racing team, where he soon earned the nickname figlio del vento (son of the wind).

In 1956 Surtees won the 500 cc world championship, MV Agusta's first in the senior class. In this Surtees was assisted by the FIM's decision to ban the defending champion, Geoff Duke, for six months because of his support for a riders' strike for more starting money. In the 1957 season, the MV Agustas were no match for the Gileras and Surtees battled to a third-place finish aboard a 1957 MV Agusta 500 Quattro.

When Gilera and Moto Guzzi withdrew from Grand Prix racing at the end of 1957, Surtees and MV Agusta went on to dominate the competition in the two larger displacement classes. In 1958, 1959 and 1960, he won 32 out of 39 races and became the first man to win the Senior TT at the Isle of Man TT three years in succession.

Auto racing career
 

While still racing motorcycles full-time, Surtees performed a test drive in Aston Martin's DBR1 sports car in front of team manager Reg Parnell. He however continued on two wheels and did not enter car racing until the following year.

In 1960, at the age of 26, Surtees switched from motorcycles to cars full-time, making his Formula 1 debut racing in the 1960 BRDC International Trophy at Silverstone for Team Lotus. He made an immediate impact with a second-place finish in only his second Formula One World Championship race, at the 1960 British Grand Prix, and a pole position at his third, the 1960 Portuguese Grand Prix.

After spending the 1961 season with the Yeoman Credit Racing Team driving a Cooper T53 "Lowline" managed by Reg Parnell and the 1962 season with the Bowmaker Racing Team, still managed by Reg Parnell but now in the V8 Lola Mk4, he moved to Scuderia Ferrari in 1963 and won the World Championship for the Italian team in 1964.

On 25 September 1965, Surtees had a life-threatening accident at the Mosport Park Circuit (Ontario, Canada) while practising in a Lola T70 sports racing car. A front upright casting had broken. A.J. Baime in his book Go Like Hell says Surtees came out of the crash with one side of his body four inches shorter than the other. Doctors set most of the breaks nonsurgically, in part by physically stretching his shattered body until the right-left discrepancy was under an inch – and there it stayed.

The 1966 season saw the introduction of new, larger 3-litre engines to Formula One. Surtees's debut with Ferrari's new F1 car was at the 1966 BRDC International Trophy at Silverstone, where he qualified and finished a close second behind Jack Brabham's 3-litre Brabham BT19. A few weeks later, Surtees led the Monaco Grand Prix, pulling away from Jackie Stewart's 2-litre BRM on the straights, before the engine failed. A fortnight later Surtees survived the first lap rainstorm which eliminated half the field and won the Belgian Grand Prix.

Due to perennial strikes in Italy, Ferrari could afford to enter only two cars (Ferrari P3s) for the 1966 24 Hours of Le Mans instead of its usual entry of three prototypes. Uncertainty and confusion surrounds subsequent events and their consequences, and a number of different explanations have been offered in the decades since. The narrative explained by Ferrari at the time states that under Le Mans rules in 1966 each car was allowed only two drivers. Surtees was omitted from the driver line-up with one works Ferrari to be driven by Mike Parkes and Ludovico Scarfiotti, and the other by Jean Guichet and Lorenzo Bandini. When Surtees questioned Ferrari team manager Eugenio Dragoni as to why, as the Ferrari team leader, he would not be allowed to compete, Dragoni told Surtees that he did not feel that he was fully fit to drive in a 24-hour endurance race because of the injuries he had sustained in late 1965. However, Surtees himself described things somewhat differently. In his recollection, when the pairings were announced he was to drive alongside Scarfiotti. As the faster driver of the two, Surtees argued that he should take the first stint and "try to break" the Ford opposition by driving "flat out from the start". Dragoni denied Surtees's request and insisted that Scarfiotti take the start, supposedly to please Fiat chairman Gianni Agnelli, Scarfiotti's uncle, who was in attendance as a spectator. Either way, the decision and subsequent lack of support from Enzo Ferrari himself were deeply upsetting to Surtees and he immediately quit the team. This decision likely cost both Ferrari and Surtees the Formula 1 Championship in 1966. Ferrari finished second to Brabham-Repco in the Constructors' Championship and Surtees finished second to Jack Brabham in the Drivers' Championship. Surtees finished the season driving for the Cooper-Maserati team, winning the last race of the season.

Surtees competed with a T70 in the inaugural 1966 Can-Am season, winning three races of six to become champion over other winners Dan Gurney (Lola), Mark Donohue (Lola) and Phil Hill (Chaparral) as well as the likes of Bruce McLaren and Chris Amon (both in McLarens).

In December 1966, Surtees signed for Honda. After a promising third place in the first race in South Africa, the Honda RA273 hit a series of mechanical problems. The car was replaced by the Honda RA300 for the Italian Grand Prix, where Surtees slipstreamed Jack Brabham to take Honda's second F1 victory by 0.2 seconds. Surtees finished fourth in the 1967 Drivers' Championship.

The same year, Surtees drove in the Rex Mays 300 at Riverside, near Los Angeles, in a United States Auto Club season-ending road race. This event pitted the best American drivers of the day – normally those who had cut their teeth as professional drivers on oval dirt tracks – against veteran Formula One Grand Prix drivers, including Jim Clark and Dan Gurney.

In 1970, Surtees formed his own race team, the Surtees Racing Organisation, and spent nine seasons competing in Formula 5000, Formula 2 and Formula 1 as a constructor. He retired from competitive driving in 1972, the same year the team had their greatest success when Mike Hailwood won the European Formula 2 Championship. The team was finally disbanded at the end of 1978.

After Formula One

For a while in the 1970s Surtees ran a motorcycle shop in West Wickham, Kent, and a Honda car dealership in Edenbridge, Kent. He continued his involvement in motorcycling, participating in classic events with bikes from his stable of vintage racing machines. He also remained involved in single-seater racing cars and held the position of chairman of A1 Team Great Britain, in the A1 Grand Prix racing series from 2005 to 2007. His son, Henry Surtees, competed in the FIA Formula 2 Championship, Formula Renault UK Championship and the Formula BMW UK championship for Carlin Motorsport, before he died while racing in the Formula 2 championship at Brands Hatch on 19 July 2009. In 2010, Surtees founded the Henry Surtees Foundation in his son's memory, as a charitable organization to assist victims of accidental brain injuries and to promote safety in driving and motorsport.

He was the subject of This Is Your Life in 1992 when he was surprised by Michael Aspel.

In 1996, Surtees was inducted into the International Motorsports Hall of Fame. The FIM honoured him as a Grand Prix "Legend" in 2003. Already a Member of the Order of the British Empire (MBE), he was appointed an Officer of the Order of the British Empire (OBE) in the 2008 Birthday Honours and a Commander of the Order of the British Empire (CBE) in the 2016 New Year Honours for services to motorsport.

In 2013 he was awarded the 2012 Segrave Trophy in recognition of multiple world championships, and being the only person to win world titles on 2 and 4 wheels.

In 2015, he was awarded the honorary degree of Doctor of Engineering by Oxford Brookes University.

Personal life and death
Surtees married three times, first to Patricia Burke in 1962; the couple divorced in 1979. His second wife was Janis Sheara, whom he married in 1979 and they divorced in 1982. Jane Sparrow was his third wife, whom he married in 1987, and with whom he had three children, Leonora, Edwina and Henry.

Surtees died of respiratory failure on 10 March 2017 at St George's Hospital in London, at the age of 83. He was buried, next to his son Henry, at St. Peter and St. Paul's Church in Lingfield, Surrey.

A tribute to Surtees was held at the Goodwood Members Meeting on 19 March 2017.

Racing record

Motorcycle Grand Prix results

(key) (Races in bold indicate pole position; races in italics indicate fastest lap)

† The 500 cc race was stopped by bad weather, and the FIM excluded the race from the World Championship.

Complete Formula One World Championship results
(key) (Races in bold indicate pole position; Races in italics indicate fastest lap)

Non-championship Formula One results
(key) (Races in bold indicate pole position)
(Races in italics indicate fastest lap)

Complete British Saloon Car Championship results
(key) (Races in bold indicate pole position; races in italics indicate fastest lap.)

Complete 24 Hours of Le Mans results

Complete European Formula Two Championship results
(key) (Races in bold indicate pole position; races in italics indicate fastest lap)

 Graded drivers not eligible for European Formula Two Championship points

Complete Canadian-American Challenge Cup results
(key) (Races in bold indicate pole position) (Races in italics indicate fastest lap)

References

External links

 John Surtees official web site 
 Biography from GrandPrix.com
 Biography from F1db.com
 Sky Sport video documentary on John Surtees
 John Surtees Isle of Man TT statistics at iomtt.com
 Grand Prix History: Hall of Fame John Surtees

1934 births
2017 deaths
500cc World Championship riders
350cc World Championship riders
250cc World Championship riders
24 Hours of Le Mans drivers
12 Hours of Reims drivers
A1 Grand Prix team owners
BBC Sports Personality of the Year winners
BRDC Gold Star winners
BRM Formula One drivers
Cooper Formula One drivers
Deaths from respiratory failure
English Formula One drivers
British motorcycle racers
English motorcycle racers
English racing drivers
Ferrari Formula One drivers
Formula One team owners
Formula One team principals
Formula One World Drivers' Champions
Formula One race winners
Honda Formula One drivers
International Motorsports Hall of Fame inductees
Isle of Man TT riders
Team Lotus Formula One drivers
North American Racing Team Formula One drivers
Commanders of the Order of the British Empire
People from Tandridge (district)
Reg Parnell Racing Formula One drivers
Surtees Formula One drivers
World Sportscar Championship drivers
Segrave Trophy recipients
12 Hours of Sebring drivers
500cc World Riders' Champions